Alpha Cottage School (often referred to as Alpha Boys School, Convent of Mercy "Alpha" Academy and now called Alpha Institute) was the name of the vocational residential school on South Camp Road in Kingston, Jamaica, still run by Roman Catholic nuns. Established in 1880 as a "school for wayward boys", it became renowned for both the discipline it instilled in its pupils and the outstanding musical tuition they received. In 2014 Alpha's residence closed and the school continued as Alpha Institute to focus on educational and vocational training for inner city unattached youth.

School band
The school band was formed in 1892. It was originally a drum and fife corps, and later a brass band, following the gift of brass instruments from the Roman Catholic Bishop of Jamaica. The school has been credited with influencing the development of ska and reggae. Its music instructors have included Lennie Hibbert, Ruben Delgado and Sparrow Martin.

Sister Mary Ignatius Davies, an alumnus of the Alpha Academy next door, is recognized as a factor in the strength of Alpha's program and that of Jamaican music more broadly. Sister Ignatius did not teach music or know how to play an instrument. Sister Ignatius owned a sound system called Mutt And Jeff Sound.

The Alpha Alumni Ensemble is composed of former students of the school who are now professional musicians.

Alpha self help programs
The school has a long history with trying to be self-sufficient. Older trades such as tile making, tailoring and farming had a direct impact on sustaining the school, were part of the vocational culture of the school and opportunities to work. Self-help now includes wood working, screen printing, digital print services and music performance.

In April 2013, Alpha Boys School launched a new clothing project to support the school with two tee shirt designs by Michael Thompson (aka Freestylee: Artist Without Borders) and equipment provided by Digicel Jamaica. Alpha's tee shirts include designs for the Jamaica Sound System Federation & Active fashion India.

Notable alumni
Notable alumni, all musicians, include: 
 Theophilus Beckford
 "Deadly" Headley Bennett 
 Cedric Brooks
Winston Francis
 Johnny Osbourne
 Vin Gordon
Eskimo Fox, original drummer of Creation Rebel, African Headcharge and Singers and Players and one of the founders of On-U Sound Records.
 Owen Gray
 Joe Harriott 
 Wilton Gaynair
 Leslie Thompson
 Bobby Ellis
 David Madden
 Harold McNair 
 Dizzy Reece
 Keith Sterling
 Rico Rodriguez
 Richard Hall (musician)
 Four founding members of the Skatalites (Tommy McCook, Johnny "Dizzy" Moore, Lester Sterling and Don Drummond) 
 Leroy Smart
 Eddie "Tan Tan" Thornton
 Yellowman
 Trinity (musician)
 Leroy "Horsemouth" Wallace
 Floyd Lloyd
 Albert "Apple Gabriel" Craig;

Alpha Boys School Radio
Alpha Boys' School Radio  is a 24/7 online radio station (www.alphaboysschoolradio.com) and celebration of the legacy established by the Kingston, Jamaica-based school responsible for the education and musical development of Jamaica's premiere jazz, ska, reggae and dancehall pioneers.  Featuring music performed by Alpha's alumni, including jazz stalwarts of the 1950s and 1960s like Joe Harriott and Dizzy Reece, ska pioneers the Skatalites, Cedric 'Im' Brooks and Rico Rodriguez; rocksteady innovator Vin Gordon; reggae icons Leroy Smart and Leroy 'Horsemouth' Wallace; and the original King of the Dancehall, Winston 'Yellowman' Foster; Alpha Boys' School Radio is a 24/7 connection to the beat of Jamaican music. Every February, Alpha Boys School Radio hosts the Reggae Auction to benefit social services for Alpha students.

Book 
In November, 2017, authors Heather Augustyn and Adam Reeves published their comprehensive book, Alpha Boys' School: Cradle of Jamaican Music, from Half Pint Press. The book chronicles over 40 musicians who attended Alpha Boys' School and contains exclusive interviews and photographs from many of the musicians.

See also
List of schools in Jamaica

References

Boys' schools in Jamaica
Educational institutions established in 1880
Schools in Kingston, Jamaica
Catholic schools in Jamaica
1880 establishments in Jamaica